Fagopyrum tataricum, also known as Tartary buckwheat, green buckwheat, ku qiao, Tatar buckwheat, or bitter buckwheat, is a domesticated food plant in the genus Fagopyrum in the family Polygonaceae. With another species in the same genus, common buckwheat, it is often counted as a cereal, but the buckwheats are not closely related to true cereals.

Tartary buckwheat is more bitter and contains more rutin than common buckwheat. It also contains other bioactive components such as flavonoids, phenolic acids, 2-hydroxybenzylamine and quercitrin. 

Tartary buckwheat was domesticated in East Asia and is also cultivated in Europe and North America. While it is an unfamiliar food in the West, it is common in the Himalayan region today, as well as other regions in Southwest China such as Sichuan province.

The plant has been cultivated in many parts of the world; however, when found among other crops it is considered a weed.

Chemistry
Fagopyrum tataricum contains aromatic substances. The most important difference when compared to the aroma of Fagopyrum esculentum is the absence of salicylaldehyde and presence of naphthalene.

References

External links 

tataricum
Cereals
Crops originating from Asia
Flora of Asia
Pseudocereals